2019 in Bellator MMA is the eleventh year in the history of Bellator MMA, a mixed martial arts promotion based in the United States. Bellator held 27 events in 2019. Including having Underground Legend Kenny Rivera

Bellator Featherweight World Grand Prix Tournament
Current featherweight champion, Patrício Freire, is a participant and if he were to lose, the victor will be declared lineal champion until he loses or wins the tournament and becomes undisputed champion.

Bellator Welterweight World Grand Prix Tournament
In 2018, Bellator organised the 2018–2019 Welterweight Grand Prix that will crown the Bellator Welterweight champion. All fights will be five rounds. If Rory MacDonald were to lose, the victor will be declared lineal champion until he loses or wins the tournament and becomes undisputed champion.

Lorenz Larkin versus Ion Pascu took place to determine an tournament alternate, with Larkin winning to stand as the alternate.
Champion Rory MacDonald retained his title in a majority draw. He advanced to fight Neiman Gracie.

Bellator 214

Bellator 214: Fedor vs. Bader took place on January 26, 2019 at The Forum in Inglewood, California. The event aired live on Paramount Network and DAZN.

Background

This event concluded the Bellator Heavyweight World Grand Prix by awarding the winner of the main event with the Bellator Heavyweight World Championship. This belt was vacated in May 2016 by Vitaly Minakov, who had not defended the title since April 2014. Fedor Emelianenko and current Bellator Light Heavyweight World Champion Ryan Bader both advanced to the finals.

A featherweight bout between elite prospects Aaron Pico and Henry Corrales was announced for the event on November 7, 2018.

On November 19, 2018, it was announced that Bellator Middleweight World Champion Gegard Mousasi would be defending the title against Rafael Lovato Jr. in the co main event. However, Mousasi pulled out on December 19 due to back injury and Lovato was eventually pulled from the card.

On December 3, 2018, it was announced that Bellator 214 would feature the MMA debut of former WWE World Heavyweight Champion and NCAA Division I All-American  Jake Hager.

Results

Bellator Newcastle

Bellator Newcastle: Pitbull vs. Scope took place on February 9, 2019 at Utilita Arena in Newcastle upon Tyne, England.

Background

The event marked the start of Bellator's new European series.

The event was headlined by a lightweight title bout between Patricky Freire and Ryan Scope.

Results

Bellator 215

Bellator 215: Mitrione vs. Kharitonov took place on February 15, 2019 at Mohegan Sun Arena in Uncasville, Connecticut The event aired on Paramount Network and DAZN.

Background

The event featured a heavyweight bout between Matt Mitrione and Sergei Kharitonov in the main event.

Results

Bellator 216

Bellator 216: MVP vs. Daley took place on February 16, 2019 at Mohegan Sun Arena in Uncasville, Connecticut. The event aired on DAZN and Sky Sports in the UK live.

Background

The event featured a Quarter-Final round bout in the Bellator Welterweight World Grand Prix between Michael Page and Paul Daley in the main event.

On January 10, 2019 it was reported that a welterweight bout between Erick Silva and Yaroslav Amosov was added to the event.

The card also featured the Bellator MMA debut of former K-1, Pride and UFC fighter Mirko Cro Cop, as he faced Roy Nelson in a rematch. The pair previously fought seven-and-a-half years ago at UFC 137.

Results

Bellator 217

Bellator 217: Gallagher vs. Graham took place on February 23, 2019 at 3Arena in Dublin, Ireland. The event aired on Paramount Network, DAZN and Sky Sports in the UK and Ireland.

Background

This card marked Bellator's third event held in Ireland.

The event featured a bantamweight bout between James Gallagher and Steven Graham in the main event.

Results

Bellator 218

Bellator 218: Sanchez vs. Karakhanyan 2 took place on March 22, 2019 at WinStar World Casino in Thackerville, Oklahoma The event aired on Paramount Network and DAZN.

Background

The event was to feature a featherweight main event bout between Emmanuel Sanchez and Ashleigh Grimshaw; However, the promotion announced that March 8 that Georgi Karakhanyan replaced Grimshaw due to undisclosed reasons. The two previous met at Bellator 170 where Sanchez won by a close decision.

A Light Heavyweight bout between Christian Edwards and Roman Huerta was cancelled the day of the weigh-in. Huerta did not weigh in as he was reportedly more than five pounds heavier than Edwards.

Results

Bellator 219

Bellator 219: Awad vs. Girtz took place on March 29, 2019 at Pechanga Resort & Casino in Temecula, California. The event aired on Paramount Network and DAZN.

Background

The event was expected to feature a welterweight bout between Andrey Koreshkov and Lorenz Larkin. However, Larkin pulled out on March 1 due to undisclosed reasons. Koreshkov remained on the card facing Michael Jasper.

A lightweight bout between Saad Awad and Brandon Girtz was announced as the new main event.

Results

Bellator 220

Bellator 220: MacDonald vs. Fitch took place on April 27, 2019 at SAP Center in San Jose, California. The event aired live on DAZN.

Background

The event featured in the main event a Bellator Welterweight World Championship bout between the champion Rory MacDonald and Jon Fitch. The bout served as both a title defense for MacDonald and a quarter-final match in the Bellator Welterweight World Grand Prix.

The event featured a Bellator Women's Flyweight World Championship bout between the champion Ilima-Lei Macfarlane and Veta Arteaga.

Results

Bellator Birmingham

Bellator Birmingham: Primus vs. Wilde took place on May 4, 2019 at Resorts World Arena in Birmingham, England.

Background

This is the second event in the Bellator European series.

The event featured a lightweight bout between former champion Brent Primus and Tim Wilde.

Results

Bellator 221

Bellator 221: Chandler vs. Pitbull took place on May 11, 2019 at Allstate Arena in Rosemont, Illinois. The event was aired exclusively on DAZN.

Background

The event featured a Bellator Lightweight Championship bout between the champion Michael Chandler and current Bellator Featherweight Champion Patrício Pitbull.

Results

Bellator 222

Bellator 222: MacDonald vs. Gracie took place on June 14, 2019 at Madison Square Garden in New York, New York. The event aired exclusively on DAZN.

Background

The event featured a Bellator Welterweight Championship bout between the champion Rory MacDonald and Neiman Gracie. The bout served as both a title defense for MacDonald and a semi-final match in the Bellator Welterweight World Grand Prix.

The event also featured a light heavyweight bout between former UFC Light Heavyweight Champion Lyoto Machida and Chael Sonnen, as well as a Bellator Bantamweight Championship bout between current champ Darrion Caldwell and Kyoji Horiguchi. The bout was a rematch from the 2018 meeting between the two that took place at RIZIN 14 on New Year's Eve.

Results

Bellator 223

Bellator London/Bellator 223 took place on June 22, 2019 at SSE Arena in London, England.

Background

The event marked the third event in Bellator's European series, with the Bellator London portion of the card airing on Channel 5 in the UK, including the five-round middleweight title fight between current champ Gegard Mousasi and Rafael Lovato Jr.

The five fights billed as Bellator 223 will take place on Paramount Network and DAZN, with the headlining bout featuring Paul Daley and Erick Silva in a welterweight contest.

The event featured a Bellator Middleweight World Championship bout between Gegard Mousasi and Rafael Lovato Jr.

Melvin Manhoef returned to action for the first time since 2017 at the event, facing England's Kent Kauppinen.

Results

Bellator 224

Bellator 224: Budd vs. Rubin took place on July 12, 2019 at WinStar World Casino in Thackerville, Oklahoma. The event took place on Paramount Network and DAZN.

Background

The event featured a Bellator Women's Featherweight Championship between Julia Budd and Olga Rubin.

Results

Bellator 225

Bellator 225: Mitrione vs. Kharitonov 2 was a mixed martial arts event that took place on August 24, 2019 at Webster Bank Arena in Bridgeport, Connecticut. The event took place on Paramount Network and DAZN.

Background

This marked the second major MMA event to take place in Connecticut proper, after CES 56, rather than on tribal or reservation land, and will be overseen by the Connecticut Boxing Commission.

The event featured a heavyweight rematch between Matt Mitrione and Sergei Kharitonov. The two met earlier in the year at Bellator 215 where the bout ended in a no contest 15 seconds into the bout due to an accidental groin kick.

Vitaly Minakov was originally scheduled to face Javy Ayala on the card. However, the day of the event it was announced that Ayala was pulled from the fight by the Connecticut Boxing Commission due to an undisclosed medical reason; as a result Timothy Johnson moved up from a preliminary bout against Azunna Anyanwu to face Minakov in the co-main event.

Bellator 225 became the first event in the organizational history where every bout ended via stoppage.

Results

Bellator 226

Bellator 226: Bader vs. Kongo took place on September 7, 2019 at SAP Center in San Jose, California. The event took place on DAZN.

Background

The event featured the first four bouts in the Bellator Featherweight World Grand Prix.

The event also featured a Bellator Heavyweight Championship bout between the champion Ryan Bader and Cheick Kongo.

Results

Bellator Dublin/Bellator 227

Bellator Dublin/Bellator 227 took place on September 27, 2019 at 3Arena in Dublin, Ireland. The event marked the fourth event in Bellator's European series, with the Bellator Dublin portion of the card airing on Channel 5 in the UK.

Background

The Bellator Dublin main event was original a bantamweight bout between James Gallagher and Cal Ellenor. However, Ellenor pulled out on September 16 due to injury. Gallagher instead fought UFC veteran Roman Salazar.

The fights billed as Bellator 227 took place on Paramount Network and DAZN, with the headlining bout featuring former WEC and UFC Lightweight Champion Benson Henderson and Myles Jury.

Brandon Girtz was expected to face Paul Redmond at the event. Redmond pulled out on September 4 due to injury. Girtz was instead to face Bellator newcomer Jon Tuck. The bout was canceled after Girtz pulled out due to injury.

Results

Bellator 228

Bellator 228: Machida vs. Mousasi 2 took place on September 28, 2019 at The Forum in Inglewood, California. The event will take place on DAZN.

Background

The event was headlined by a rematch between Lyoto Machida and Gegard Mousasi. The pair previously met on February 15, 2014 in the main event at UFC Fight Night 36. Machida won the earlier bout by unanimous decision.

The event also featured a Bellator Featherweight World Championship bout between the champion Patricio Freire and Juan Archuleta, a first round bout in the Bellator Featherweight World Grand Prix.

Results

Bellator 229

Bellator 229: Koreshkov vs. Larkin took place on October 4, 2019 at Pechanga Resort and Casino in Temecula, California. The event took place on Paramount Network and DAZN.

Background

The event featured a welterweight bout between former Bellator Welterweight Champion Andrey Koreshkov and Lorenz Larkin.

Results

Bellator Milan/Bellator 230

Bellator Milan/Bellator 230 took place on October 12, 2019 at Ex Palalido (Allianz Cloud) in Milan, Italy.

Background

The event marked the fifth event in Bellator's European series, with the Bellator Milan portion of the card airing on Channel 5 in the UK, including the light heavyweight bout between Alessio Sakara and Canaan Grigsby.

The fights billed as Bellator 230 were shown on Paramount Network and DAZN, with the headlining bout featuring former Bellator Middleweight Champion Rafael Carvalho and Vadim Nemkov.

Bellator Kickboxing was also featured on the card.

Results

Bellator 231

Bellator 231: Mir vs. Nelson 2 took place on October 25, 2019 at Mohegan Sun Arena in Uncasville, Connecticut. The event took place on Paramount Network and DAZN.

Background

The event featured a heavyweight bout between former UFC Heavyweight Champion Frank Mir and Roy Nelson. The two previously met at UFC 130 where Mir won by unanimous decision.

Results

Bellator 232

Bellator 232: MacDonald vs. Lima 2 took place on October 26, 2019 at Mohegan Sun Arena in Uncasville, Connecticut. The event aired on DAZN.

Background

The event featured the finals of the Bellator Welterweight World Grand Prix for the Bellator Welterweight World Championship between the champion Rory MacDonald and former champion Douglas Lima. The two previously met at Bellator 192 where MacDonald won by unanimous decision to claim the championship.

Vitaly Minakov was expected to face Javy Ayala at the event. Eventually, Minakov pulled out due to visa issues and the bout was cancelled.

A Featherweight bout between Robin van Roosmalen and Cris Lencioni was scheduled for the main card. However, Van Roosmalen missed the featherweight limit by nine pounds and the bout was cancelled. Isaiah Chapman also came in one-quarter pound over the allotted bantamweight limit.

Results

Bellator 233

Bellator 233: Salter vs. van Steenis took place on November 8, 2019 at WinStar World Casino in Thackerville, Oklahoma. The event  aired on Paramount Network and DAZN.

Background

The event featured a middleweight bout between John Salter and Costello van Steenis.

Jason Perrotta and Robert Gidron missed weight for their respective bouts.

Results

Bellator 234

Bellator 234: Kharitonov vs. Vassell took place on November 14, 2019 at Menora Mivtachim Arena in Tel Aviv, Israel. The event will air on November 15 via tape delay on Paramount Network and DAZN.

Background

The event featured a heavyweight bout between Sergei Kharitonov and Linton Vassell.

Results

Bellator London 2

Bellator London: MVP vs. Melillo was an event for Bellator MMA that took place on November 23, 2019 at The SSE Arena in London, England.

Background

The event was the sixth event of the Bellator European Series and second of 2019 in London. The event was to be headlined by a welterweight bout between Michael Page and Derek Anderson. However, on November 12, it was announced Anderson had pulled out of the bout due to an undisclosed injury. Page instead fought Gianni Melillo.

Results

Bellator 235

Bellator USO Salute to the Troops: Misech vs. Perez was an event for Bellator MMA that took place on December 20, 2019 at Neal S. Blaisdell Arena in Honolulu, Hawaii. The event took place on Paramount Network and DAZN.

Background

The event was expected to feature a heavyweight bout between the former UFC Heavyweight Champion Josh Barnett and UFC veteran Ronny Markes. However, the bout was cancelled after Barnett was pulled due to illness just moments before the fight was scheduled to take place. The originally scheduled bantamweight bout between Toby Miesch and Erik Perez was bumped to the main event.

Results

Bellator 236

Bellator 236: Macfarlane vs. Jackson was an event for Bellator MMA that toom place on December 21, 2019 at Neal S. Blaisdell Arena in Honolulu, Hawaii. The event streamed on DAZN.

Background

The event featured a Bellator Women's Flyweight World Championship bout between the champion Ilima-Lei Macfarlane and Kate Jackson.

Neiman Gracie was expected to face Kiichi Kunimoto at the event. Gracie pulled out a few days before the event due to injury. Kunimoto instead fought Jason Jackson.

Results

Bellator 237

Bellator Japan (also known as Bellator 237: Fedor vs. Rampage) was a co-promotion event Bellator MMA and Rizin that took place on December 29, 2019 at Saitama Super Arena in Saitama, Japan. The event aired live on Paramount Network and DAZN in the United States on December 28, 2019. The preliminary matches featured RIZIN fighters.

Background

The event was announced by Bellator on October 9, 2019 and was the company's debut in Japan. The event was co-promoted by the Japanese mixed martial arts organization Rizin Fighting Federation. It featured a heavyweight bout between former Pride FC Heavyweight Champion Fedor Emelianenko and former UFC Light Heavyweight Champion Quinton Jackson.

A 160 pound catchweight bout between former Bellator Lightweight Champion Michael Chandler and former WEC and UFC Lightweight Champion Benson Henderson was expected to take place at the event. It was to have been a rematch from Bellator 165 where Chandler won by split decision over Henderson to remain the lightweight champion. However, Henderson pulled out on December 5 due to injury. Chandler instead faced Sidney Outlaw.

Results

References

External links
Bellator

2019 in mixed martial arts
Bellator MMA events